Sibet Attena (– 8 November 1473) was an East Frisian chieftain. He was a son of Sibet of Dornum ("old Sibet") (d. 1433) and Frouwa of Manslagt, a daughter of Enno Cirksena.

From his father he inherited the Beninga Castle in Dornum.  From his first wife, Onna of Stedesdorf, a daughter of Hero Omken the Elder, he inherited Stedesdorf in 1447.  As a nephew and a loyal supporter of Ulrich Cirksena, he was invested with Esens in 1454.  He was also to inherit Manslagt via his mother, but he renounced this.

Also in 1454, he supported Ulrich Cirksena against Tanne Kankena in Wittmund.  He occupied Kankena's castle in Wittmund and expelled him.  Seven years later he invested Kankena with Dornum.  From 1455, he called himself "Chieftain at Esens, Stedesdorf and Wittmund".  Thus, he viewed himself as the ruler of the Harlingerland.

After Onna of Stedesdorf died in 1464, he married his second wife Margaret of Westerwolde.

Sibet was present in 1464 at the solemn ceremony in the Guesthouse Church in Emden where Ulrich Cirksena was raised to Imperial Count and was knighted during that ceremony.

After his death, a magnificent sandstone sarcophagus was erected for him in the church of Esens (now the St. Magnus Church) in 1473.

Issue 
Children from his first marriage:
 Wibet, married with Tyader of Jever (no issue)
 Hero of Dornum, better known as Hero Omken the Younger, married to Armgard, Duchess of Oldenburg and had issue
 Frouwa, married with Edo Wiemken the Younger, chieftain of Jever (no issue)

Children from his second marriage:
 Ulrich of Dornum, married Essa of Oldersum (no issue) and secondly, Hyma of Grimersum
 Sibo (no issue)

References 
 

East Frisia
East Frisian chieftains
1420s births
1473 deaths
Year of birth uncertain